Gilbert Casalecchi (20 March 1908 – 26 February 1990) was a Swiss sailor. He competed in the Dragon event at the 1960 Summer Olympics.

References

External links
 

1908 births
1990 deaths
Swiss male sailors (sport)
Olympic sailors of Switzerland
Sailors at the 1960 Summer Olympics – Dragon
Sportspeople from Bologna